Julio Miguel de Vido (born December 26, 1949) is an Argentine politician who was Minister of Planning and Public Investment between 2003 and 2015.

Biography
De Vido was born in the City of Buenos Aires in 1949. Enrolling at the University of Buenos Aires School of Architecture and Urbanism, he graduated in 1974. He returned to the remote Province of Santa Cruz, and was named Works Director within the province's Housing and Urban Development Institute in 1988 by Justicialist Governor Héctor Marcelino García. He was promoted to the post of Provincial Highway Bureau Director in 1990.

The 1991 election of Río Gallegos Mayor Néstor Kirchner as Governor led to de Vido's appointment as Santa Cruz's Economy Minister, in which capacity he oversaw the investment of a US$535 million payout Kirchner negotiated for his oil-rich province when the State oil concern, YPF, was privatized in 1993. Julio de Vido was elected to the Argentine Lower House of Congress in the 1997 midterm elections. He returned to Santa Cruz Province halfway through his term, however, and was named Minister of Government by Governor Kirchner, securing de Vido's role as Kirchner's chief adviser.

Helping coordinate Kirchner's presidential campaign in the 2003 general election, de Vido was named to his later post as Minister of Planning when Kirchner became President of Argentina on May 25, 2003; the post was reinstated to cabinet-level status following a 12-year hiatus. Overseeing the nation's public works, de Vido has presided over a dramatic increase in public investment, though he has reaped criticism for his apparent reliance on patronage and for doting a disproportionate share of these record investments into Santa Cruz Province, home to 0.6% of the Argentine population. His wife, Alessandra Minnicelli, served as Director of SIGEN (the chief auditing office of the Argentine government) from 2003 to 2007, and the couple has been the focus of a number of investigations regarding their increasing net worth. Authorizing mostly gradual public sector rate increases during most of his tenure.

Minister de Vido was instrumental in shaping President Cristina Kirchner's record US$32 billion public works plan for 2009-2010. He later confirmed that the plan's headline project, the construction of the Buenos Aires-Rosario-Córdoba high-speed railway (the first of its kind in the Western Hemisphere), would be postponed in favor of developing greater nuclear power capacity to satisfy growing electricity demand. He, along with Labor Minister Carlos Tomada, became the longest-serving cabinet member in the Kirchnerist era that began in 2003.

De Vido was appointed on April 16, 2012, to head the Federal intervention of YPF, the leading fossil fuel producer and distributor in Argentina. The company, which had been privatized in 1993 and acquired by Repsol of Spain in 1999, was partly renationalized amid ongoing production declines.

On October 25, 2017, the Congreso de la Nación Argentina revoked his immunity as parliamentarian for illicit actions. He was interned for corruption. He remains parliamentarian but cannot access the corresponding remuneration nor assist to meetings during his detention.

References

External links

 Ministerio de Planificación Federal, Inversion Pública y Servicios 

1949 births
Living people
People from Buenos Aires
University of Buenos Aires alumni
Government ministers of Argentina
Justicialist Party politicians
Prisoners and detainees of Argentina
Kirchnerism
Members of the Argentine Chamber of Deputies elected in Buenos Aires Province